A spite house is a building constructed or substantially modified to irritate neighbors or any party with land stakes. Because long-term occupation is not the primary purpose of these houses, they frequently sport strange and impractical structures.

Spite houses may create obstructions, such as blocking out light or blocking access to neighboring buildings, or they can be flagrant symbols of defiance. Although, in the US, homeowners generally have no right to views, light, or air, neighbors can sue for a negative easement. In instances regarding a spite build, courts are far more likely to side with the neighboring parties which may have been affected by that build. For example, the Coty v. Ramsey Associates, Inc. case of 1988 ruled that the defendant's spite farm constituted a nuisance, granting the neighboring landowner a negative easement.

Spite houses, as well as spite farms, are considerably rarer than spite fences. This is partially attributable to the fact that modern building codes often prevent the construction of houses likely to impinge on neighbors' views or privacy, but mostly because fence construction is far cheaper, quicker, and easier than home construction. There are also similar structures known as spite walls or blinder walls.

Construction of spite houses or spite fences is considered illegal in those countries which follow the civil law. It is considered as abuse of rights, and in some countries, like Finland, it is explicitly prohibited by law.

Examples

In 541, after the conquest of Antioch, Sassan Emperor Khosrau I built a new city near Ctesiphon for the 30,000 inhabitants he captured, he modelled this city after the original Antioch and was said to have forced the inhabitants to live in their old homes/old workplaces. He called this new city Weh Antiok Khusrau, or literally, "better than Antioch, Khosrau built this."
In 1716, Thomas Wood, a sailmaker, built a house in Marblehead, Massachusetts, that subsequently became known as the Old Spite House. One possibility is that it was inhabited by two brothers who occupied different sections, would not speak to each other, and refused to sell to the other. Another explanation is that the  house, just tall enough to block the view of two other houses on Orne Street, was built because its owner was upset about his tiny share of his father's estate and therefore decided to spoil his older brothers' view. The Old Spite House is still standing and occupied.
In 1806, Thomas McCobb, heir to his father's land and shipbuilding business, returned home to Phippsburg, Maine, from sea to discover that his stepbrother Mark had inherited the family "Mansion in the Wilderness". Upset about his loss, McCobb built a house directly across from the McCobb mansion to spite his stepbrother. The National Park Service's Historic American Buildings Survey photographed and documented the 1925 move of the McCobb Spite House by barge from Phippsburg to Deadman's Point in Rockport, Maine.
In 1814, John Tyler, an eminent ophthalmologist and one of the first American-born physicians to perform a cataract operation, owned a parcel of land near the courthouse square in Frederick, Maryland. The city made plans to extend Record Street south through Tyler's land to meet West Patrick Street. In fighting the city, Tyler discovered a local law that prevented the building of a road if work was in progress on a substantial building in the path of a proposed road. To spite the city, Tyler immediately had workmen pour a building foundation, which was discovered by the road crews the next morning.
In 1830, John Hollensbury's home in Alexandria, Virginia, was one of two houses that directly bordered an alley that attracted an annoying amount of horse-drawn wagon traffic and loiterers. The brick walls of the Hollensbury Spite House living room have gouges from wagon-wheel hubs, and the house is still standing and occupied.
The Skinny House in Boston is considered a spite house. One story of its creation tells that in 1874, two brothers in the North End of Boston, Massachusetts, got into a dispute. Each had previously inherited land from their deceased father. While the second brother was away serving in the military, the first brother built a large home, leaving the soldier only a shred of property that the first brother felt certain was too tiny to build on. When the soldier returned, he found his inheritance depleted and built a wooden house at 44 Hull St. to spite his brother by blocking the sunlight and ruining his view.
In 1880, Adam Schilling owned a tract of  adjoining the town of Hiawatha, Kansas. Schilling sold three-quarters of an acre of this land, on which a house eventually was built and became owned by James Falloon. To spite his neighbor, Schilling then built a cheap tenement house on his own property  from Falloon's with the "idea of rendering Falloon's home obnoxious and unendurable to Falloon and family" by renting to people Falloon might find objectionable.

The Richardson Spite House in New York City at Lexington Avenue and 82nd Street was built in 1882 and demolished in 1915. It was four stories tall, 104 feet (31.7 m) wide, and only five feet (1.5 m) deep. Joseph Richardson, the owner of the plot, built it after the owner of an adjacent plot, Hyman Sarner, unsuccessfully tried to purchase the land. Sarner considered the plot useless by itself and offered only $1000; Richardson demanded $5000. After the deal fell through, Richardson had an apartment building constructed on his land. It was a functional (albeit impractical) apartment building with eight suites, each consisting of three rooms and a bath.
 In the early 1890s, in the Astor family, William Waldorf Astor's mansion was next door to that of his aunt, Caroline Webster Schermerhorn Astor, on the block later occupied by the Empire State Building. He and his aunt did not get along well, and William replaced his mansion with a hotel, the original Waldorf Hotel in 1893. The building not only towered over his aunt's home, but it also had no windows at all on the side facing the aunt's mansion.
At some point before 1898, a home was erected in Salem, Massachusetts, to "cut off the view of a neighbor". After the owner died, his heirs agreed in 1898 to have the Salem Spite House torn down to avoid a "vexatious lawsuit with the obnoxious neighbor".
In the 19th century, a Collinsville, Connecticut, butcher feuded with his neighbor. To spite his neighbor, the butcher built between their adjoining houses a narrow, two-story structure with windows covered by Venetian blinds. The wooden building located between 23 and 25 River St. was the width of a standard stairway and allowed the butcher to block the sun to the neighbor's home and block the neighbor's view of the butcher's property at will. The butcher's son got along with the family next door and eventually tore down the Collinsville Spite House.
Also in the 19th century, a Freeport, New York, developer who opposed all of Freeport being laid out in a grid, put up a Victorian house virtually overnight on a triangular plot at the corner of Lena Avenue and Wilson Place to spite the grid designers. The Freeport Spite House is still standing and occupied.

At the turn of the 20th century, the city of Alameda, California, took a large portion of Charles Froling's land to build a street. Froling had planned to build his dream house on the plot of land he received through inheritance. The Alameda Spite House is still standing and occupied. He cantilevered the front-facing second story to maximize floor space while avoiding encroachment on zoning setbacks.
In 1904, the family of a deceased Joseph Edleston owned a plot of land next to the churchyard of St. Mary's in Gainford, England. The children asked to erect a monument in the churchyard in memory of Joseph's 41-year tenure at the church. The church refused permission, asserting that the churchyard was full but that the family could donate their land to the church and then build a monument on part of it. Feeling slighted, the family immediately set about building themselves a house on their land with a  column erected next to the churchyard so it towered over the trees. The Edleston Spite House is still standing and occupied, and has MCMIV (1904)  over the front door.
In 1907 there was a "spite" church in Brooklyn, New York. It was built to take advantage of a law that forbid the operation of saloons within a certain distance of churches. Saloon owners  brought suit against the church arguing that the church was not a real church and no worship was practiced. The saloon owners won the case.

In 1908, Francis O'Reilly owned an investment parcel of land in West Cambridge, Massachusetts, and approached his abutting land neighbor to sell the land for a gain. The O'Reilly Spite House is still standing and is occupied by an interior decorating firm .
The Sam Kee Building, built in 1913 in Vancouver, British Columbia, is a spite house. The city widened the street and took a large part of Mr. Kee's land who then built a  building on the remaining very small parcel of land.
Before 1914, the Austro-Hungarians who ruled Sarajevo in Bosnia and Herzegovina wanted land in the Sarajevo Old Town district to build a city hall and library. The land had a home on it and, despite offering the owner money, he refused and continued to refuse even when told that he had to move. When the officials threatened him, he moved the house and rebuilt it, piece by piece, on the other side of the Miljacka river, as a way of spiting the officials. The Sarajevo Spite House operates today as a restaurant called Inat Kuća (which means "Spite House").
In 1922, The Pink House was built in Newbury, Massachusetts. According to local legend, as per the terms of a divorce settlement, a man was required to build an exact replica of his house for his now ex-wife, but since the wife had failed to specify where the house be built, he built in the Great Marsh on the edge of town with saltwater plumbing.
In 1925, according to one common story, a Montlake, Seattle, Washington neighbor made an insultingly low offer for a tiny slice of adjoining land. Out of spite for the low offer, the builder built an  house that blocked the neighbors' open space. However, there are other stories about how the house came to be, making its origins murky. The Montlake Spite House is still standing and occupied.
In 1934, Corina Kavanagh, of Irish descent, commissioned the building of a skyscraper in Buenos Aires, the iconic Kavanagh Building, at the time the highest skyscraper in Latin America. Local legend holds that Corina Kavanagh sought to arrange a marriage between one of her daughters and the son of the Anchorena family, one of the wealthiest and traditionalist aristocratic families of the country; the Anchorenas, however, refused. Out of revenge, she had her high-rise building built between the Anchorena's palace and the church the family had erected on the opposing side of the adjoining square.
In the 1950s, two Virginia City, Nevada neighbors got into a dispute. The Virginia City Spite House is still standing and occupied.
 In 1954, a thin wedge-shaped building was erected by architects Salah and Fawzi Itani on a 120 sq m plot in Beirut, Lebanon at the request of a man wanting to spoil the sea view of his brother after they failed to agree to jointly develop their neighboring plots. The street facade appears to be an ordinary apartment building, but is 60 cm at the narrowest and four meters at the widest. It is known as Al Ba'sa (The Middle Finger) and formerly as The Queen Mary due to its resemblance to a ship.

 Film producer George Lucas had wanted to construct a movie studio on land that he owned in Marin County, California. After facing years of opposition, Lucas abandoned the project in 2012. Instead, he decided to construct a low-income housing development. While some sources have speculated that the low-income housing proposal was to spite the high-income residents in the wealthy county, Lucas himself rejected that characterization.
The Westboro Baptist Church, located in Topeka, Kansas, is a hate group known for its anti-LGBT picketing. The humanitarian charity Planting Peace purchased a house across the street from the church and, in 2013, had it painted to match the colors of the rainbow pride flag. It was named the 'Equality House' and has received worldwide attention and media coverage. In 2016, Planting Peace acquired the house next door to the Equality House and painted it the colors of the transgender pride flag. The houses provide shelter to volunteers and a community garden.

In fiction 
In 1839 or 1840, Edgar Allan Poe, in his story "The Business Man", wrote the following passage in the voice of Peter Proffit, a man who imagines himself a legitimate businessman although the reader realizes that he is a con man. Proffit's attempted scam in this passage is to build a spite house and extort his neighbors to pay him to tear it down. (He calls this line of business 'the Eye-Sore trade'.)

Whenever a rich old hunks, or prodigal heir, or bankrupt corporation, gets into the notion of putting up a palace, there is no such thing in the world as stopping either of them, and this every intelligent person knows. The fact in question is indeed the basis of the Eye-Sore trade. As soon, therefore, as a building project is fairly afoot by one of these parties, we merchants secure a nice corner of the lot in contemplation, or a prime little situation just adjoining or tight in front. This done, we wait until the palace is half-way up, and then we pay some tasty architect to run us up an ornamental mud hovel, right against it; or a Down-East or Dutch Pagoda, or a pig-sty, or an ingenious little bit of fancy work, either Esquimau, Kickapoo, or Hottentot. Of course, we can't afford to take these structures down under a bonus of five hundred per cent upon the prime cost of our lot and plaster. Can we? I ask the question. I ask it of business men. It would be irrational to suppose that we can.

 In season 10 of  Curb Your Enthusiasm, Larry David opens Larry's Latte as a "spite store" to get revenge on Mocha Joe's.

See also

 Air rights
 Cutting off one's nose to spite one's face
 Eyesore
 Holdout (real estate)
 Nail house
 Sam Kee Building
 Smallest House in Great Britain
 Spite (sentiment)
 Spite fence

References

Further reading

Buildings and structures by type
Lists of buildings and structures
Revenge